Wełdkówko  (German: Klein Voldekow) is a village in the administrative district of Gmina Tychowo, within Białogard County, West Pomeranian Voivodeship, in north-western Poland.
For the history of the region, see History of Pomerania.

The village has a population of 40.

References

Villages in Białogard County